Alan Aleksandrovich Alborov (born 28 October 1989) is a Russian professional football player.

Club career
He made his Russian Football National League debut for FC KAMAZ Naberezhnye Chelny on 15 September 2008 in a game against FC Dynamo Barnaul.

External links
 
 

1989 births
Sportspeople from Vladikavkaz
Living people
Russian footballers
Russia youth international footballers
Association football midfielders
FC KAMAZ Naberezhnye Chelny players
FC Gornyak Uchaly players
FC Irtysh Omsk players
FC Spartak Vladikavkaz players
PFC CSKA Moscow players
FC Neftekhimik Nizhnekamsk players
FC Novokuznetsk players
FC Inter Cherkessk players
FC Smena Komsomolsk-na-Amure players
FC Mashuk-KMV Pyatigorsk players